Amed is a 14-km strip of fishing villages in Karangasem Regency on the east coast of Bali, Indonesia. The area name Amed is taken from one of its seven villages. The other six are called Jemeluk, Bunutan, Lipah, Selang, Banyuning and Aas. 

Many beaches in the area, including Amed Beach, have black volcanic sand as they are close to Mount Agung, Bali's largest volcano.

Amed is an area developing for tourism while holding on to tradition. It is slowly becoming known as a destination for backpacker tourism, free diving, scuba diving, and yoga classes and teacher training.

See also
 List of fishing villages

References

Fishing communities
Karangasem Regency
Populated places in Bali
Underwater diving sites in Indonesia